Freaknik (originally Freaknic) is an annual spring break festival in Atlanta, Georgia. It is primarily attended by students from historically black colleges and universities. It began in 1983 as a small picnic in a public park near the Atlanta University Center sponsored by the D.C. Metro Club for students who could not afford to return home for spring break. It continued as an annual event held during the third weekend in April. The event increased in size and popularity in the 1990s, incorporating dance contests, concerts, parties, a basketball tournament, rap sessions, a film festival and a job fair. The Atlanta magazine called it Atlanta's most infamous street party. In 1999, actions by the police and elected officials caused celebration of Freaknik to cease. A revamped version returned for one day on June 22, 2019 as "FreakNik Atlanta '19 - The Festival" with a concert at Cellairis Amphitheatre at Lakewood. As of 2020, it was set to move forward as a three-day event centered around artists performing. 

Originally "Freaknic," the name of the event is a portmanteau of "picnic" and "freak," in accordance with the D.C. Metro Club's 1982-1983 theme "The Return of the Freak".

History
Freaknik was conceived in March 1982 on Spelman College in a DC Metro Club meeting headed by then president Schuyla Goodson. It was sponsored by the  Club, which was composed of students from Washington, D.C., Maryland, and Virginia. The DC Metro Club intended for it to be challenge to the California Club for the largest end-of-the-school-year party. Goodson invented the name Freaknik (then spelled "Freaknic") as a portmanteau of freaky and picnic. The name Freaknik was inspired by Le Freak by CHIC, a popular song and dance in the early 1980s. First held in John A. White Park in April 1982, it was attended by at most 150 students, featuring a potluck and dancing. Two DJs were present: Nab (from New York state) and  Daryl Baptiste Miller, who both were students of Morehouse College.  

In 1988, Spelman College President Johnnetta B. Cole banned the DC Metro Club from involvement with Freaknic for school liability reasons. With no chartered student organization presiding over the event, Daryl Baptiste Miller was asked by the DC Metro Club to promote it. Daryl Baptiste Miller had work as an independent national promoter and advance for Casual Cal, Cedric Walker, Don King, Uncle Jams Army, Lakers Michael Cooper, WAOK Road Shows, Al Haymond Presents and Fantasy Entertainment ( the main party promoter of the AUC at the time) made the event epic. The event grew from 15,000 to over 300,000 in five years. This event would take place at the then 33-acre Lakewood Fairgrounds and would have 60 thousand people in attendance. In 1993 two non HBCU promoters Ronn Greene and Diya Nabawi would be the first to trademark the name, spelled officially as "Freaknik" (ending with a "k"). This was a hijacking of the name and was a insult to the dignity of a then positive student events spirit and wholesome intent of the event. 

In 1993 Kristina Copeland, a woman from Washington, D.C. and Ronn Greene, would produce the second event held at Lakewood Fairgrounds. They invited the provocative artist Luke Campbell and the nature of the event took a turn to being a very undignified event.  Non-HBCU people began incorporating nudity and wild partying. Atlanta University Center students promoted Freaknic as a non-provocative events to try to distinguish it from the once wholesome event it started as. Traffic became unmanageable during Freaknik as the event became popular to non HBCU and college students in general. There were reports of violence, looting and sexual assault.

The event became open to the general public, and people from the United States, Canada, the Caribbean and Europe came to participate in it. In 1990, it was attended by 300,000, many of whom did not plan to attend Freaknic, compared to the previous year's 80,000. In 1991, up to 350,000 people attended it.

As Freaknik grew, the attitudes toward it of local homeowners and business owners became negative. It was challenged by Atlanta businesses, neighborhood associations, business owners and community leaders. Under pressure, Atlanta Mayor Bill Campbell cracked down on Freaknik in 1996. Large numbers of Atlanta police made it difficult to party in Freaknik or commit crimes. Roadblocks were placed at freeway exits that led to Atlanta. After city leaders took these measures to curtail Freaknic's accessibility, its popularity faded. The event moved east from Atlanta to Memorial Drive in DeKalb County, Georgia. 

The Associated Press reported on May 13, 1998 that the Atlanta Committee for Black College Spring Break should no longer welcome Freaknik. "We cannot support events that bring lewd activities, sexual assaults, violence against women and public safety concerns—firetrucks not being able to reach victims, and ambulances not being able to reach hospitals in a timely manner," said committee chairman George Hawthorne. 

By 1999, the celebration of the festival in DeKalb County died down due to heightened police security. In April 2010, Atlanta officials said: "there are no permitted Freaknic-related events inside the city limits." Atlanta Mayor Kasim Reed also said that "he will be tough and even sue organizers of any Freaknic-related activities who violate city guidelines."

After a 20-year hiatus, the last official Freaknik being in 1999, Atlanta-based promotion company After 9 Partners and Carlos Neal contracted Luther Campbell, Juvenile, Trina and others to spearheaded the return of a revamped Freaknik in June 2019. The Summer 2019 Freaknik featured hip-hop and R&B music artists performing at the Cellairis Amphitheatre. Other activities were available throughout Atlanta, such as a community service event.  Many of the 20,000+ attendees were adults who participated in the official Freakniks of the 80s and 90s.

In culture

Williams Street Studios produced a one-hour special spoof titled Freaknik: The Musical based on the popular festival. The show aired on television network Adult Swim on March 7, 2010.

A season two episode of Popular features the character Mary Cherry saying "I went to Freaknik in hotlanta and turned the mother out" when grilled on her spring break activities.

A season one episode of True Life followed college students during 1998's Freaknik. A season six episode of Sister, Sister chronicled Tia and Tamera's trip from Michigan to Atlanta toward Freaknik with their college friends.

In his mixtape "STN MTN / Kauai," Childish Gambino opens by saying that he had a dream that he ran Atlanta, and among other things, he would bring back Freaknik.

On "Hair Day", the eleventh episode of season six of the ABC series Black-ish, Dre reveals to his son Jack that as a younger man he was beaten in a dance-off by a someone who brought his own whistle to the party, which raised the ire of his oldest son, Junior, who insisted Dre had told him "What happens at Freaknik stays at Freaknik."

Freaknik is referenced in many rap songs from the 1990s and early 2000s.

See also

Freaknik: The Musical
African Americans in Atlanta
Magic City (club)
 List of hip hop music festivals
 Urban Beach Week
Woodstock '99

References

Festivals in Atlanta
African-American festivals
Post–civil rights era in African-American history
History of Atlanta
Hip hop music festivals in the United States
Music festivals established in 1983
1983 establishments in Georgia (U.S. state)
Hip hop dance festivals
African-American film festivals